Danthalapally is a Mandal in Mahabubabad district, Telangana.

References

Mahabubabad district
Mahabubabad